James Fuller (December 18, 1892 – December 25, 1987) was an American Negro league catcher in the 1910s and 1920s.

A native of Raleigh, North Carolina, Fuller made his Negro leagues debut in 1912 with the Cuban Giants, and played with the club through 1915. He went on to play for several other teams, finishing his career in 1927 with the Lincoln Giants. Fuller died in New York, New York in 1987 at age 95.

References

External links
 and Baseball-Reference Black Baseball Stats and Seamheads

1892 births
1987 deaths
Bacharach Giants players
Brooklyn Royal Giants players
Cuban Giants players
Lincoln Giants players
Philadelphia Giants players
Baseball catchers
Baseball players from Raleigh, North Carolina
Burials at Long Island National Cemetery